Jordan coup d'état may refer to:

 1957 alleged Jordanian military coup attempt
 2021 arrests in Jordan, a response to an alleged coup attempt

See also
Black September, a civil war fought between the Jordanian government and the Palestinian Liberation Organization